Heikant or Oordeel Heikant is a hamlet in the Dutch province of North Brabant. It is a part of the municipality of Baarle-Nassau, and lies about 15 km south of Tilburg.

This Heikant (the name means "heath edge") should not be confused with the other hamlet of the same name lying 8 km to the west and also in Baarle-Nassau, or with any of the dozens of other Heikants in the Netherlands and Belgium.

Heikant is not a statistical entity, and the postal authorities have placed it under Baarle-Nassau. It consists of about 20 house.

References

Populated places in North Brabant
Baarle-Nassau